William Joseph Striegel (May 28, 1936 – July 23, 1992) was an American football offensive guard in the National Football League for the Philadelphia Eagles. He also was a member of the Oakland Raiders and Boston Patriots in the American Football League. He played college football at the University of the Pacific.

Early years
Striegel attended Chico Senior High School. He accepted a football scholarship from the University of the Pacific. He became a starter as a two-way tackle.

Professional career
Striegel was selected by the Philadelphia Eagles in the eighth round (88th overall) of the 1958 NFL Draft. He suffered an injury in practice with the 1958 College All-Star steam and was lost for the season. On May 9, 1959, he was re-signed by the Eagles and was converted into an offensive guard during training camp. He appeared in 12 games as a backup.

In 1960, Striegel was selected by the Dallas Cowboys in the expansion draft. He was tried at linebacker and defensive end. He was released before the start of the season in September.

On September 19, 1960, he was signed as a free agent by the Oakland Raiders of the American Football League to play as an offensive tackle. He appeared in one game during their inaugural season before being cut in October.

In October 1960, he signed with the Boston Patriots of the American Football League to play as a linebacker. He appeared in 5 games with one start during their inaugural season.

Personal life
In September 1965, he was hired by the expansion franchise Atlanta Falcons to work as a scout.

References

1936 births
1992 deaths
People from Leavenworth County, Kansas
Players of American football from Kansas
American football guards
American football tackles
American football linebackers
Pacific Tigers football players
Philadelphia Eagles players
Oakland Raiders players
Boston Patriots players
Atlanta Falcons scouts